Ion Talianu (1898–1956) was a Romanian stage actor. He also appeared in six films.

Filmography
 The Valley Resounds (1950)
 A Lost Letter (1953)
 Mitrea Cocor (1953)
 The Sun Rises (1954)
 Pe raspunderea mea (1956)
 The Protar Affair (1956)

References

Bibliography 
 Cristian Sandache. Literatura si propaganda in Romania lui Gheorghiu Dej. 2001.

External links 
 

1898 births
1956 deaths
Romanian male film actors
Romanian male stage actors
People from Târgu Ocna